Miroiu is a Romanian surname. Notable people with the surname include:

Adrian Miroiu (born 1954), Romanian political philosopher
Mihaela Miroiu (born 1955), Romanian political theorist and activist

Romanian-language surnames